John Patrick Lyons (8 November 1956 – 11 November 1982) was a Welsh footballer who played as a forward in the Football League.

Career
Lyons was born in Buckley, Wales. He attended the Buckley County Primary School and Elfed High School. Whilst at the High School he represented Wales as an Under 15 basketball player. He began his football career with Wrexham as an apprentice and signed as a professional player in September 1975. He scored 23 goals in 86 appearances and helped the team to the Third Division title in the 1977–78 season. He joined Millwall in 1979, making 55 appearances and registering 20 league goals, many of which were from free-kicks just outside the penalty box, his speciality. He then signed for Cambridge United, where he appeared 21 times scoring 6 goals. He joined Colchester United for £25,000 and scored on his debut as Colchester defeated rivals Sheffield United 5–2 in front of the Match of the Day cameras. Lyons committed suicide at his home in Layer de la Haye on 11 November 1982 only hours after appearing for Colchester United at Layer Road.

Honours

Club
Wrexham
 Football League Third Division Winner (1): 1977–78

Individual
 Millwall Player of the Year (1): 1980

References

External links
 
 

1956 births
1982 deaths
Welsh footballers
Association football forwards
Cambridge United F.C. players
Colchester United F.C. players
Wrexham A.F.C. players
Millwall F.C. players
English Football League players
People from Buckley, Flintshire
Sportspeople from Flintshire
1982 suicides
Suicides in England